Royal Excelsior Virton is a Belgian football club, from the city of Virton in Luxembourg province.

Current squad

Out on loan

Club staff

References 

 
Association football clubs established in 1922
Football clubs in Belgium
1922 establishments in Belgium
R.E. Virton